Pamela "Pam" O'Connor (born 22 March 1980 in Glasgow) is a Scottish former ice dancer who competed internationally representing Great Britain. With her husband Jonathon O'Dougherty, she is the 2003 British national champion.

Career 
O'Connor competed with partner Jonathan O'Dougherty. They competed at one World Championships, finishing 19th in 2002, and twice at the European Championships, finishing 16th in 2003 and 14th in 2005. They won medals at several internationals – Finlandia Trophy, Pavel Roman Memorial, Ondrej Nepela Memorial, and Golden Spin of Zagreb – and one senior national title. They retired from competitive skating in 2005.

In 1999, O'Connor appeared as a young figure skater in a Robbie Williams music video.

O'Connor competed on the British and Australian versions of Dancing on Ice in 2006. In Dancing on Ice (UK) series 1, O'Connor was partnered with David Seaman and was voted out in the semi-final. In series 2 one year later, she was partnered with Neil Fox and was voted out in week 1.

Personal life 
O'Connor grew up in Cumbernauld and attended Cumbernauld High School. She is married to O'Dougherty.

Programs

Competitive highlights 
(with Jonathon O'Dougherty)

References

External links
 
 Pam O'Connor / Jonathon O'Dougherty
 
 She's The One – Music Video

Scottish female ice dancers
Sportspeople from Glasgow
1980 births
Living people